Sir Richard Hugh Turton Gozney  (born 21 July 1951) is a British career diplomat.  He was governor and commander in chief of Bermuda from 12 December 2007 to 18 May 2012 and served as the Lieutenant Governor of the Isle of Man from 27 May 2016 until 29 August 2021.

Career
Educated at Magdalen College School and St Edmund Hall, Oxford, Gozney joined the Foreign and Commonwealth Office in 1973. He became Head of Chancery and Political Section in Madrid in 1984, Private Secretary to the Secretary of State for Foreign and Commonwealth Affairs in 1989 and British High Commissioner to Swaziland in 1993. 

After that, he became Head of the Security Policy Department at the Foreign and Commonwealth Office in 1996, Chief of the Assessments Staff at the Cabinet Office in 1998 and British Ambassador to Indonesia in 2000. He then became British High Commissioner to Nigeria in 2004, Governor and Commander-in-Chief of Bermuda in 2007 and Lieutenant Governor of the Isle of Man in 2016.

Family
He married Diana Edwina Baird on 24 April 1982 and has two sons.

Publication
Gibraltar and the EC: Aspects of the Relationship (Royal Institute of International Affairs Discussion Paper, 1993)

References

|-

|-

1951 births
Alumni of St Edmund Hall, Oxford
Ambassadors of the United Kingdom to Indonesia
High Commissioners of the United Kingdom to Nigeria
High Commissioners of the United Kingdom to Eswatini
Ambassadors of the United Kingdom to Benin
Ambassadors of the United Kingdom to Equatorial Guinea
Commanders of the Royal Victorian Order
Governors of Bermuda
Knights Commander of the Order of St Michael and St George
Living people
People educated at Magdalen College School, Oxford
Principal Private Secretaries to the Secretary of State for Foreign and Commonwealth Affairs
Members of HM Diplomatic Service
Lieutenant Governors of the Isle of Man
20th-century British diplomats
21st-century British diplomats